ABB is a Swedish-Swiss high-tech engineering multinational corporation.

ABB may also refer to:

abb, ISO 639-3 code for the Bankon language, a Bantu language of Cameroon
ABB, former IATA code of RAF Abingdon
ABB, IATA code of Asaba International Airport in Nigeria
ABB, reporting mark of the Akron and Barberton Belt Railroad 
αΒΒ, a deterministic global optimization algorithm
ABB (Azərbaycan Beynaxalq Bankı), the International Bank of Azerbaijan
ABB Grain, an Australian agribusiness
African Blood Brotherhood, a former radical black liberation group in the United States
Alex Boncayao Brigade, a Filipino communist death squad
The Allman Brothers Band, an American rock band
Archives of Biochemistry and Biophysics, a peer-reviewed scientific periodical
 Activity Based Budgeting
 ABB (banana), a clade of banana

People with the surname
Gustav Abb (1886–1945), German librarian